Ornithinimicrobium tianjinense is a Gram-positive, non-spore-forming, heterotrophic and strictly aerobic bacterium species from the genus Ornithinimicrobium which has been isolated from a recirculating aquaculture system.

References

External links
Type strain of Ornithinimicrobium tianjinense at BacDive -  the Bacterial Diversity Metadatabase

Actinomycetia
Bacteria described in 2013